William Cluxton (March 31, 1819 – February 16, 1901) was a businessman and political figure in Ontario, Canada. He represented Peterborough West in the House of Commons of Canada from 1873 to 1874 as a Conservative member.

He was born in Dundalk, County Louth, Ireland, the son of George Cluxton, and came to Canada while still young. He married Mary Anne Payne. Cluxton served as reeve of Peterborough. He was manager of the Commercial Bank at Peterborough and later president of the Peterboro and Monaghan Gravel Road Company, the Little Lake Cemetery Company and the Midland Railway Company. Although Cluxton received fewer votes than John Bertram, he was declared elected because Bertram had not established his eligibility under the Elections Act.

Notes

External links 
 
The Canadian parliamentary companion, HJ Morgan (1873)

1819 births
1901 deaths
19th-century Irish people
Politicians from County Louth
Conservative Party of Canada (1867–1942) MPs
Members of the House of Commons of Canada from Ontario
Irish emigrants to pre-Confederation Ontario